Ryan Dennick (born January 10, 1987) is an American former professional baseball pitcher. He played in Major League Baseball (MLB) for the Cincinnati Reds.

Career

Kansas City Royals
Dennick was drafted by the Kansas City Royals in the 22nd round of the 2009 Major League Baseball Draft out of Tennessee Technological University.

Cincinnati Reds
He was acquired by the Cincinnati Reds in the minor league phase of the Rule 5 Draft before the 2013 season.

Dennick was called up to the majors for the first time on September 2, 2014, and made his major league debut that day against the Baltimore Orioles.

Los Angeles Dodgers
The Dodgers claimed him off waivers on April 15, 2015. He was assigned to the AA Tulsa Drillers but was designated for assignment on April 17. He was outrighted to the minors and appeared in 47 games for the Drillers, with a 2.94 ERA.

Lancaster Barnstormers
On May 6, 2016, Dennick signed with the Lancaster Barnstormers of the Atlantic League of Professional Baseball. He became a free agent after the 2016 season.

Coaching career
Dennick is currently the pitching coach for the Tulsa Drillers, the Class-AA affiliate of the Los Angeles Dodgers.

See also
Rule 5 draft results

References

External links

1987 births
Living people
People from North Olmsted, Ohio
Baseball players from Ohio
Major League Baseball pitchers
Cincinnati Reds players
Tennessee Tech Golden Eagles baseball players
Idaho Falls Chukars players
Burlington Royals players
Burlington Bees players
Wilmington Blue Rocks players
Northwest Arkansas Naturals players
Pensacola Blue Wahoos players
Louisville Bats players
Toros del Este players
American expatriate baseball players in the Dominican Republic
Indios de Mayagüez players
Tulsa Drillers players
Oklahoma City Dodgers players
Lancaster Barnstormers players
Minor league baseball coaches